Suktabari   is a Gram panchayat in the Cooch Behar I (community development block) of Cooch Behar Sadar subdivision of Cooch Behar district in West Bengal state, India.

Education
 Suktabari Ekramia High Madrasah
 Suktabari State High Madrasah

See also
 Dudher Kuthi Dewan Bosh
 Suktabari Ekramia High Madrasah
 Suktabari State High Madrasah

References

Cooch Behar district